Madhepura is one of the 40 Lok Sabha constituencies in Bihar state in eastern India.

Sharad Yadav started his political innings in his home state of Madhya Pradesh in 1970s, but he later made Madhepura his base, winning from here 4 times and losing 4 times. He won from here in 1991, 1996, (lost to Lalu Prasad Yadav in 1998), 1999 (defeating Lalu), (lost to Lalu in 2004), won again in 2009. He lost in 2014 and then again 2019, both times falling to Modi wave.

Vidhan Sabha segments  
After the delimitation in 2009, presently Madhepura constituency comprises the following six Vidhan Sabha segments:

Members of Lok Sabha

^ by-poll

Election results

2019 Lok Sabha Election

2014 Lok Sabha Election

2004 Lok Sabha Election

2004 bye-election
Pappu Yadav (RJD) : 365,948 votes
Rajendra Prasad Yadav (JD-U) : 157,088

1999 Lok Sabha Election
 Sharad Yadav (JD(U)) : 328,761 votes
 Lalu Prasad Yadav (RJD) : 298,441

See also
 Khagaria district
 List of Constituencies of the Lok Sabha

References

Lok Sabha constituencies in Bihar
Politics of Madhepura district
Politics of Saharsa district